Anthony Lancelot Dias (14 March 1910 — 22 September 2002), also known as A. L. Dias was an Indian Civil Service officer and politician of Goan origin. Dias was born in Bombay and was in the Maharashtra cadre. He was awarded the Padma Vibhushan in 1970 for his management  of a drought in Bihar. He also played a  role in the liberation of Goa from the Portuguese rule. Dias was the Lieutenant governor of Tripura from 1969 to 1971. He was the Governor of West Bengal from 1971 to 1977.

References

1912 births
2002 deaths
Governors of West Bengal
Recipients of the Padma Vibhushan in public affairs
Indian Civil Service (British India) officers